Pinar del Río is the capital city of Pinar del Río Province, Cuba. With a population of 139,336 (2004) in a municipality of 190,332, it is the 10th-largest city in Cuba. Inhabitants of the area are called Pinareños.

History
Pinar del Río was one of the last major cities in Cuba founded by the Spanish, on September 10, 1867. The city and province was founded as Nueva Filipinas (New Philippines) in response to an influx of Asian laborers coming from the Philippine Islands to work on tobacco plantations.

Pinar del Río's history begins with the Guanahatabey, a group of nomadic Indians who lived in caves and procured most of their livelihood from the sea. Less advanced than the other indigenous natives who lived on the island, the Guanahatabey were a peaceful and passive race whose culture came about largely independently of the Taíno and Siboney cultures further east. The Guanahatabey were extinct by the time of the Spanish arrival in 1492; little firsthand documentation remains of how the archaic Guanahatabey society was structured and organized, although some archeological sites have been found on the Guanahacabibes Peninsula.

Post-Columbus, the conquistadors left rugged Pinar del Río largely to its own devices, and the area developed lackadaisically only after Canary Islanders started arriving in the late 1500s. These Canarians became the tobacco farmers of the region. It was originally called Nueva Filipina (New Philippines), but the region was renamed Pinar del Río in 1778, supposedly for the pine forests crowded along the Río Guama. Tobacco plantations and cattle ranches quickly sprang up in the rich soil, along with open grazing land that typifies Pinar. Farmers who made a living from the delicate and well-tended crops were colloquially christened Guajiros, a native word that literally means 'one of us'. By the mid-1800s Europeans were hooked on the fragrant weed, and the region flourished. Sea routes opened up and the railways was extended to facilitate the shipping of the perishable product. Pinar del Río is known as "the Mecca of tobacco".

Geography
The municipality borders San Luis, San Juan y Martínez, Viñales and Consolación del Sur. The villages included in the municipality are Briones Montoto, Cayo Conuco, La Coloma, La Conchita and Las Ovas.

Climate
Pinar del Río has a warm tropical climate, more specifically a tropical monsoon climate (Am) according to the Köppen climate classification scheme.

Demographics
In the 2002 national census, the following statistics were recorded:
Area: 70.7 km² (city); 708 km² (municipality)
Population: 189,221 (total); 152,200 (city); 30,417 (surrounding rural area)
Density: 270,4 /km²

In 2004, the municipality of Pinar del Río had a population of 190,532.

Economy
The city is located in a major tobacco-growing area and is a centre of the cigar industry. The main farming animal in this province is the carabao.

Sport
The local baseball club is Pinar del Río, nicknamed Vegueros, and the association football one is FC Pinar del Río. Both the clubs have their home ground in the Capitán San Luis Stadium. The Vegueros are the Serie del Caribe 2015 champions. Also Major League Baseball and Hall of Famer for the Minnesota Twins Tony Oliva is from Pinar del Rio.

Transport
The city is served by the Carretera Central highway and by the A4 motorway. Pinar del Río Airport is abandoned, and La Coloma Airport  has no scheduled flights. There is a railway station on the line to Havana.

Education
The main post-secondary education institution is the University of Pinar del Río.

Notable people

 Danys Báez – Major League Baseball pitcher
 Mario Bencomo – painter
 René Capo – Olympic Judoka
 Willy Chirino – singer-songwriter
 Sen Dog – member of Cypress Hill
 Yunieski Gonzalez – boxer
 Dagoberto Valdés Hernández – religious leader/writer
 Carlos Luna – artist
 Mijaín López – three-time Olympic Greco-Roman Wrestling champion
 Yunesky Maya – pitcher for the Washington Nationals
 Polo Montañez – singer/songwriter
 Dolan Mor – writer
 Pedro Pablo Oliva – painter
 Tony Oliva – Outfielder for the Minnesota Twins and Major League Baseball Hall of Famer.
 Rudy Pérez – composer
 Alexei Ramírez – infielder for the Chicago White Sox
 Yoel Romero – Mixed Martial Artist, Olympic wrestler
 Gonzalo Rubalcaba – pianist
 Eduardo Zamacois – Spanish novelist
 Paulina Pedroso- leader in the Cuban War of Independence.

Gallery

See also
 Filipino Cuban
 List of cities in Cuba
 Municipalities of Cuba

References

External links

 Pinar del Río.cu
 Pinar del Río on EcuRed
 Pinar del Río on guije.com (historical infos)
  (historical infos)

 
Cities in Cuba
Populated places in Pinar del Río Province
World Heritage Sites in Cuba
Populated places established in 1774
1770s establishments in Cuba
1774 establishments in the Spanish West Indies